Hydroxyphenamate or oxyfenamate (trade name Listica) is a sedative and anxiolytic drug of the carbamate class which is no longer marketed in the US. Like other carbamate sedatives, it is chemically related to meprobamate (Miltown). It was introduced to the US market in 1961. The dosage for adults is 200 mg 3 to 4 times daily.

References

Anxiolytics
Carbamates
GABAA receptor positive allosteric modulators
Tertiary alcohols